Stephen Powers (1840–1904) was an American journalist, ethnographer, and historian of Native American tribes in California.  He traveled extensively to study and learn about their cultures, and wrote notable accounts of them.  His articles were first published over a series of years in the Overland Monthly journal, but collected in The Tribes of California (1877) published by the US Geological Survey.

Early years
Stephen Powers was born in Waterford, Ohio.  He attended and graduated from the recently established University of Michigan in 1863.

During the American Civil War years, Powers served as a Union Army correspondent for the Cincinnati Commercial newspaper.

In 1869 Powers left Ohio for the West.  He walked across the Southern and Western United States to his destination of San Francisco, California. After arriving, Powers wrote about his experiences and observations, and had his book published in 1871.

California Native Americans
Between 1871 and 1876, Stephen Powers traveled thousands of miles on foot and horseback through the Northern, Central Coast, and great Central Valley regions of California. Powers become very familiar with the various distinctive Native Californian Indian population groups and tribes. He studied their lives and crafts including: spiritual and religious beliefs and ceremonies; indigenous languages, narratives and mythology; art forms of basketry, rock art, carvings, pottery and weaving; dwellings and belongings.

He also studied their ways of interacting with plants and animals for food, clothing, medicines, and tools. Powers observed and documented their adaptations to circumstances from a hundred years of homeland invasions by Spanish, Mexican, and European-American immigrants settling on their land, and the resulting consequences.

Stephen Powers published his diverse ethnographic studies in a series of articles, which appeared primarily in the Overland Monthly journal from 1872-1877.

Tribes of California 

Stephen Powers subsequently reworked his Tribes of California articles, notes and other material for a book's publication. It was published in 1877 as part of the federally sponsored Geographical and Geological Survey of the Rocky Mountain Region series edited by the renowned western geologist John Wesley Powell, then Director of the Geological Survey of the Department of Interior, as well as the Bureau of Ethnological Studies at the Smithsonian Institution.

Alfred L. Kroeber, an anthropologist, director of the University of California, Berkeley's Museum of Anthropology and the dean of Native Californian ethnologists, said Stephen Powers' book Tribes of California: "..., it will always remain the best introduction to the subject."

Legacy
His book and articles are held by his alma mater, the University of Michigan, which has put them online as part of the Making of America collaboration among major universities.

See also
Population of Native California
Survey of California and Other Indian Languages
Traditional narratives (Native California)
Category: Native American tribes in California
Category: Native American history of California
California mission clash of cultures
Alfred Robinson - "Life in California" 1846Further reading
 Golla, Victor. 2011. California Indian Languages. Berkeley: University of California Press. [Discussion of Powers' work on California languages, pp. 28–30.]
 Heizer, Robert F. (editor). 1975. "Letters of Stephen Powers to John Wesley Powell Concerning Tribes of California". In Stephen Powers, California's First Ethnologist, part 2. Contributions of the University of California Archaeological Research Facility No. 28. Berkeley.
 Park, Susan. 1975. "The Life of Stephen Powers". In Stephen Powers, California's First Ethnologist, part 1. Contributions of the University of California Archaeological Research Facility No. 28. Berkeley.
 Powers, Stephen. 1871. Afoot and Alone: A Walk from Sea to Sea by the Southern Route, Adventures and Observations in Southern California, New Mexico, Arizona, Texas, etc. Columbian Book Company, Hartford, Connecticut.
 Powers, Stephen. 1975. The Northern California Indians: A Reprinting of 19 Articles on California Indians Originally Published 1872-1877''. Edited by Robert F. Heizer. Contributions of the University of California Archaeological Research Facility No. 25. Berkeley.
 , reprinted 1976

References

External links
 
Stephen Powers' "Overland Monthly" articles
Available on-line for the following cultural groups:
Karuk -— "Overland-Karuk (1)", "Overland-Karuk (2)",
Yurok —— "Overland-Yurok",
Hupa —— "Overland-Hupa",
Yuki —— "Overland-Yuki",
Pomo —— "Overland-Pomo",
Miwok —— "Overland-Miwok",
Modoc —— "Overland-Modoc",
Yokuts —— "Overland-Yokuts",
Maidu —— "Overland-Nisenan (Maiduan)",
Achumawi, Achomawi, Yana people —— "Overland-various groups",
Wintu —— "Overland-Wintu",
Patwin —— "Overland-Patwin",
Cultures —— "Overland-General characteristics of the California Indians".
"Native Tribes, Groups, Language Families and Dialects of California in 1770" (after A.L. Kroeber 1925). Adapted from Heizer (1966: Map 4), California Prehistory Website.

American anthropologists
American ethnologists
Historians of Native Americans
Native American history of California
1840 births
1904 deaths
University of Michigan alumni
People from Waterford, Ohio
Historians from Ohio
19th-century American historians
19th-century anthropologists